Szylling is a surname. Notable people with the surname include:

 Antoni Szylling (1884–1971), Polish general
 Jan Szylling (fl. 1500), Polish scholastic philosopher

Polish-language surnames